Samuel Hoskins Merrill (born May 15, 1996) is an American professional basketball player for the Cleveland Cavaliers of the National Basketball Association (NBA). He played college basketball for the Utah State Aggies.

Early life and high school career
Merrill is the son of John and Jenny Merrill and has an older sister Molli. He grew up in Bountiful, Utah, and attended Bountiful High School. He became a starter as a sophomore at the midpoint in the season and averaged 6.5 points per game and 2.6 assists. As a junior, Merrill averaged 18.3 points, 6.8 rebounds, 5.4 assists and 2.2 steals per game and was named first-team all-state by the Deseret News and Salt Lake Tribune. He posted 15.8 points, 7.4 assists, 4.6 rebounds and 2.3 steals per game as a senior and led Bountiful to a 4A state title. Merrill was recruited by Stanford and Princeton but committed to Utah State.

College career
Merrill went on a two-year mission for the Church of Jesus Christ of Latter-day Saints to Nicaragua before his freshman year at Utah State. When he returned, head coach Stew Morrill retired and was replaced by Tim Duryea. Merrill posted 9.4 points per game as a freshman.

In his sophomore season, Merrill averaged 16.3 points per game. He was named to the Third–team All-Mountain West. Merrill married soccer player Kanyan Ward in May 2018.

As a junior, Merrill averaged 20.9 points, 4.2 assists, 3.9 rebounds and 1.1 steals per game. He shot 46.1 percent from the floor, 37.6 percent from behind the arc and 90.9 percent from the free throw line. Merrill led Utah State to a Mountain West tournament championship, securing the automatic bid to the NCAA Tournament. He was named Mountain West Conference Player of the Year and Mountain West tournament MVP as well as AP Honorable Mention All-American. Merrill had a career-high 38 points on March 5, 2019, in a 100–96 overtime victory over Colorado State.

In the season opener of his senior year, Merrill had 28 points to help the Aggies defeat Montana State 81–73. On February 11, versus Colorado State, Merrill eclipsed the 2,000-point mark for his career and passed Wayne Estes for third on the school’s all-time scoring list. He finished with 32 points and five assists in a 75–72 win. At the conclusion of the regular season, Merrill was named to the First Team All-Mountain West. Merrill led Utah State to another Mountain West tournament championship, securing the automatic bid to the NCAA Tournament, and was named Mountain West tournament MVP. The tournament was canceled soon after his final game where he scored 27 points in a 59–56 upset of San Diego State in the tournament final and hit the game-winning three-pointer with 2.5 seconds remaining.

Professional career

Milwaukee Bucks (2020–2021) 
On November 18, 2020, Merrill was selected by the New Orleans Pelicans as the final pick of the 2020 NBA draft.

On November 24, Merrill was traded to the Milwaukee Bucks as part of a four-team trade, involving the Oklahoma City Thunder and the Denver Nuggets. He was assigned to the Memphis Hustle of the NBA G League to start the G League season, making his Hustle debut on February 10, 2021. In the regular season he played in 30 games for the Bucks and started two while averaging 3.0 points 1.0 rebound and shot 44.7% from three, in 7.8 minutes per game. On the Bucks playoff run Merrill appeared in 8 games averaging 3.8 minutes and 0.6 points and rebounds per game.  Merrill ended his rookie season as an NBA champion when the Bucks defeated the Phoenix Suns in 6 games of the 2021 NBA Finals.

Memphis Grizzlies (2021–2022) 
On August 7, 2021, Merrill was traded, along with two future second-round picks, to the Memphis Grizzlies in exchange for Grayson Allen. On January 1, 2022, he was waived. Merrill averaged 4.2 points and 1.2 rebounds per game in 6 games for the Grizzlies.

Cleveland Charge (2022–2023)
On August 13, 2022, Merrill signed with the Sacramento Kings. He was waived prior to the start of the season.

On October 24, 2022, Merrill joined the Cleveland Charge training camp roster. He was the No. 1 overall pick in the G-League draft two days earlier.

Cleveland Cavaliers (2023–present)
On March 3, 2023, Merrill signed a 10-day contract with the Cleveland Cavaliers. On March 14, he signed a multi-year contract with the Cavaliers.

Career statistics

NBA

Regular season

|-
| style="text-align:left;background:#afe6ba;"| †
| style="text-align:left;"| Milwaukee
| 30 || 2 || 7.8 || .444 || .447 || 1.000 || 1.0 || .7 || .3 || .0 || 3.0
|-
| style="text-align:left;"| 
| style="text-align:left;"| Memphis
| 6 || 0 || 9.7 || .333 || .304 || .500 || 1.2 || .7 || .0 || .0 || 4.2
|- class="sortbottom"
| style="text-align:center;" colspan="2"| Career
| 36 || 2 || 8.1 || .417 || .400 || .750 || 1.0 || .7 || .2 || .0 || 3.2

Playoffs

|-
| style="text-align:left;background:#afe6ba;"| 2021†
| style="text-align:left;"| Milwaukee
| 8 || 0 || 3.8 || .286 || .200 || – || .6 || .1 || .5 || .0 || .6

College

|-
| style="text-align:left;"| 2016–17
| style="text-align:left;"| Utah State
| 31 || 18 || 26.2 || .450 || .451 || .878 || 3.0 || 3.2 || .9 || .2 || 9.1
|-
| style="text-align:left;"| 2017–18
| style="text-align:left;"| Utah State
| 34 || 33 || 35.4 || .504 || .464 || .849 || 3.3 || 3.1 || 1.0 || .2 || 16.3
|-
| style="text-align:left;"| 2018–19
| style="text-align:left;"| Utah State
| 35 || 35 || 35.3 || .461 || .376 || .909 || 3.9 || 4.2 || 1.1 || .3 || 20.9
|-
| style="text-align:left;"| 2019–20
| style="text-align:left;"| Utah State
| 32 || 32 || 35.0 || .461 || .410 || .893 || 4.1 || 3.9 || .9 || .1 || 19.7
|- class="sortbottom"
| style="text-align:center;" colspan="2"| Career
| 132 || 118 || 33.1 || .470 || .420 || .891 || 3.6 || 3.6 || 1.0 || .2 || 16.6

References

External links

Utah State Aggies bio

1996 births
Living people
American men's basketball players
Basketball players from Utah
Cleveland Cavaliers players
Latter Day Saints from Utah
Memphis Grizzlies players
Memphis Hustle players
Milwaukee Bucks players
New Orleans Pelicans draft picks
People from Bountiful, Utah
Shooting guards
Utah State Aggies men's basketball players